Spadaccini is an Italian surname meaning 'Swordsman' or 'Sword maker'. Notable people with the surname include:

 Anthony Spadaccini (born 1982), Italian-American filmmaker
 Vic Spadaccini (1916–1981), Italian-American football player

Italian-language surnames
Occupational surnames